Liujia is a railway station on the Taiwan Railways Administration Liujia line located in Zhubei City, Hsinchu County, Taiwan.

Transfers to THSR Hsinchu station can be made at this station

History
The station was opened on 11 November 2011.

}}

Around the station
 Hsinchu HSR station

See also
 List of railway stations in Taiwan

References

2011 establishments in Taiwan
Railway stations in Hsinchu County
Railway stations opened in 2011
Railway stations served by Taiwan Railways Administration